Toni Eggert (born 12 May 1988) is a German luger who has competed since 2008.

Luge results
All results are sourced from the  International Luge Federation (FIL).

World Cup

References

External links

German male lugers
Living people
1988 births
Lugers at the 2014 Winter Olympics
Lugers at the 2018 Winter Olympics
Lugers at the 2022 Winter Olympics
Olympic lugers of Germany
Olympic silver medalists for Germany
Olympic bronze medalists for Germany
Olympic medalists in luge
Medalists at the 2018 Winter Olympics
Medalists at the 2022 Winter Olympics
People from Suhl
Sportspeople from Thuringia
21st-century German people